The Women's National Basketball Association (WNBA) is an American professional basketball league. It is composed of twelve teams, all based in the United States. The league was founded on April 22, 1996, as the women's counterpart to the National Basketball Association (NBA), and league play started in 1997. The regular season is played from May to September, with the All Star game being played midway through the season in July (except in Olympic years) and the WNBA Finals at the end of September until the beginning of October.

Five WNBA teams have direct NBA counterparts and normally play in the same arena: Indiana Fever, Los Angeles Sparks, Minnesota Lynx, New York Liberty, and Phoenix Mercury. The Atlanta Dream, Chicago Sky, Connecticut Sun, Dallas Wings, Las Vegas Aces, Seattle Storm, and Washington Mystics do not share an arena with a direct NBA counterpart, although four of the seven (the Dream, the Sky, the Wings, and the Mystics) share a market with an NBA counterpart, two (Mystics and Dream) play in NBA G League arenas, while the Storm shared an arena and market with an NBA team, the SuperSonics, at the time of its founding. The Dream, Sky, Sun, Wings, Aces, Sparks, and Storm are all independently owned.  The Aces are owned by Mark Davis, who also owns the Las Vegas Raiders of the NFL.

History

League founded and play begins (1996–97)
The creation of the WNBA was officially approved by the NBA Board of Governors on April 24, 1996, and announced at a press conference with Rebecca Lobo, Lisa Leslie, and Sheryl Swoopes in attendance. The new WNBA had to compete with the recently formed American Basketball League, another professional women's basketball league that began play in the fall of 1996 but would cease operation during its 1998–99 season.

The WNBA began with eight teams: the Charlotte Sting, Cleveland Rockers, Houston Comets, and New York Liberty in the Eastern Conference; and the Los Angeles Sparks, Phoenix Mercury, Sacramento Monarchs, and Utah Starzz in the Western Conference.

While not the first major women's professional basketball league in the United States (a distinction held by the defunct WBL), the WNBA is the only league to receive full backing of the NBA. The WNBA logo, "Logo Woman", paralleled the NBA logo and was selected out of 50 different designs.

On the heels of a much-publicized gold medal run by the 1996 USA Basketball Women's National Team at the 1996 Summer Olympic Games, the WNBA began its first season on June 21, 1997, to little fanfare. The first WNBA game featured the New York Liberty facing the Los Angeles Sparks in Los Angeles. The game was televised nationally in the United States on the NBC television network. At the start of the 1997 season, the WNBA had television deals in place with NBC (NBA rights holder), and the Walt Disney Company and Hearst Corporation joint venture channels, ESPN and Lifetime Television Network, respectively. Penny Toler scored the league's first point.

Houston domination and league expansion (1997–2000)

The WNBA centered its marketing campaign, dubbed "We Got Next", around stars Rebecca Lobo, Lisa Leslie, and Sheryl Swoopes. In the league's first season, Leslie's Los Angeles Sparks underperformed, and Swoopes sat out much of the season due to her pregnancy. The WNBA's true star in 1997 was WNBA MVP Cynthia Cooper, Swoopes' teammate on the Houston Comets. The Comets defeated Lobo's New York Liberty in the first WNBA Championship game.
The initial "We Got Next" advertisement ran before each WNBA season until it was replaced with the "We Got Game" campaign.

Two teams were added in 1998 (Detroit and Washington), and two more were added in 1999 (Orlando and Minnesota), bringing the number of teams in the league up to twelve. The 1999 season began with a collective bargaining agreement between players and the league, marking the first collective bargaining agreement to be signed in the history of women's professional sports.
The WNBA also announced in 1999 that it would add four more teams for the 2000 season (the Indiana Fever, the Seattle Storm, the Miami Sol, and the Portland Fire), bringing the league up to 16 teams, with WNBA President Val Ackerman discussing expansion: "This won't be the end of it. We expect to keep growing the league."

In 1999, the league's chief competition, the American Basketball League, folded. Many of the ABL's star players, including several Olympic gold medalists (such as Nikki McCray and Dawn Staley) and a number of standout college performers (including Kate Starbird and Jennifer Rizzotti), then joined the rosters of WNBA teams and, in so doing, enhanced the overall quality of play in the league. When a lockout resulted in an abbreviated NBA season, the WNBA saw faltering TV viewership.

On May 23, 2000, the Houston Comets became the first WNBA team to be invited to the White House Rose Garden. Before this invitation, only men's sports teams had traveled to the White House.

At the end of the 2000 season, the Houston Comets won their fourth championship, capturing every title since the league's inception. Led by the "Big Three" of Sheryl Swoopes, Tina Thompson, and four-time Finals MVP Cynthia Cooper, the Comets dominated every team in the league. Under head coach Van Chancellor, the team posted a 98–24 record through their first four seasons (16–3 in the Playoffs). After 2000, Cooper retired from the league, and the Comets' dynasty came to an end.

The L.A. Sparks; new league ownership and contraction (2001–2002)

The top contender in the 2001 season was the Los Angeles Sparks. Led by Lisa Leslie, the Sparks posted a regular-season record of 28–4. They advanced to their first ever WNBA Finals and swept the Charlotte Sting.

Looking to repeat in 2002, the Sparks again made a strong run toward the postseason, going 25–7 in the regular season under head coach Michael Cooper, formerly of the Los Angeles Lakers. Again, Leslie dominated opponents throughout the Playoffs, leading the Sparks to a perfect 6–0 record through all three rounds, beating the New York Liberty in the 2002 Finals.

Teams and the league were collectively owned by the NBA until the end of 2002, when the NBA sold WNBA teams either to their NBA counterparts in the same city or to a third party as a result of the dot-com bubble. This led to two teams moving: Utah moved to San Antonio, and Orlando moved to Connecticut and became the first WNBA team to be owned by a third party instead of an NBA franchise. This sale of teams also led to two teams folding, the Miami Sol and Portland Fire, because new owners could not be found.

Bill Laimbeer leaves his mark (2003–2006)
The Women's National Basketball Players Association (WNBPA) threatened to strike in 2003 if a new deal was not worked out between players and the league. The result was a delay in the start of the 2003 preseason. The 2003 WNBA Draft was also delayed, and negative publicity was gained from this strike.

After taking over a struggling franchise in 2002, former Detroit Pistons forward Bill Laimbeer had high hopes for the Detroit Shock in 2003. The team was just 9–23 in 2002. The Shock had three all-stars in the 2003 All-Star Game (Swin Cash, Cheryl Ford, and Deanna Nolan). Laimbeer orchestrated a worst-to-first turnaround and the Shock finished the season 25–9 in first place in the Eastern Conference. Winning the first two rounds of the Playoffs, the Shock faced two-time champion Los Angeles Sparks and Lisa Leslie in the 2003 Finals. The Shock beat the Sparks, winning game three on a three-pointer by Deanna Nolan.

After the 2003 season, the Cleveland Rockers, one of the league's original eight teams, folded because the owners were unwilling to continue operating the franchise.

Val Ackerman, the first WNBA president, resigned effective February 1, 2005, citing the desire to spend more time with her family. Ackerman later became president of USA Basketball. On February 15, 2005, NBA Commissioner David Stern announced that Donna Orender, who had been serving as the Senior Vice President of the PGA Tour and who had played for several teams in the now-defunct Women's Pro Basketball League, would be Ackerman's successor as of April 2005.

The WNBA awarded an expansion team to Chicago (later named the Sky) in February 2006. In the off-season, a set of rule changes was approved that made the WNBA more like the NBA.

In 2006, the league became the first team-oriented women's professional sports league to exist for ten consecutive seasons. On the occasion of the tenth anniversary, the WNBA released its All-Decade Team, comprising the ten WNBA players to have contributed, through on-court play and off-court activities, the most to women's basketball during the league's existence.

After missing out on the Finals in 2004 and 2005, the Shock bounced back in 2006 behind newly acquired Katie Smith, along with six remaining members from their 2003 Finals run (Cash, Ford, Holland-Corn, Nolan, Powell, and Riley). The Shock finished second in the Eastern Conference and knocked off first-seeded Connecticut in the second round of the Playoffs. The Shock faced reigning champion Sacramento Monarchs in a five-game series. The Shock won game five on their home floor.

Bringing "Paul Ball" to the WNBA (2007–2009)

In December 2006, the Charlotte Bobcats organization announced it would no longer operate the Charlotte Sting. Soon after, the WNBA announced that the Sting would not operate for 2007. A dispersal draft was held on January 8, 2007. Teams selected in inverse order of their 2006 records; Chicago received the first pick.

Former Los Angeles Lakers championship coach Paul Westhead was named head coach of the Phoenix Mercury on October 11, 2005, bringing his up-tempo style of play to the WNBA. This fast-paced offense was perfect for his team, especially after the league shortened the shot clock from 30 seconds to 24 seconds in 2006. Much like the early Houston Comets championship teams, the Phoenix Mercury had risen to prominence led by their own "Big Three" of Cappie Pondexter, Diana Taurasi, and Penny Taylor.

The Mercury was well-suited for the fast offense behind these three players. Phoenix averaged a league-record 88.97 points per game in 2007; teams could not keep up with the new style of play, and the Mercury were propelled into first place in the Western Conference. Facing the reigning champion Detroit Shock, the Mercury imposed their high-scoring offense with hopes of capturing their first title in franchise history. Averaging 93.2 points per game in the Finals series, the Mercury beat Detroit on their home floor in front of 22,076 fans in game five to claim their first-ever WNBA title.

In October 2007 the WNBA awarded another expansion franchise to Atlanta. Atlanta businessman Ron Terwilliger was the original owner of the new team. Citizens of Atlanta were able to vote for their choices for the new team's nickname and colors. The Dream, as they were named, played their first regular-season game on May 17, which was a 67–100 loss to the Connecticut Sun.

Paul Westhead resigned from the Mercury after capturing the 2007 title and Penny Taylor opted to stay home to prepare for the 2008 Summer Olympics, causing the Mercury to falter in 2008. The team posted a 16–18 record and became the first team in WNBA history to miss the Playoffs after winning the championship in the previous season. In their place, the Detroit Shock won their third championship under coach Bill Laimbeer, solidifying their place in WNBA history before Laimbeer resigned early in 2009, effectively ending the Shock dynasty.

During the 2008 regular season, the first-ever outdoor professional basketball game in North America was played at Arthur Ashe Stadium in New York City. The Indiana Fever defeated the New York Liberty 71–55 in front of over 19,000 fans.

Late in 2008, the WNBA took over ownership of one of the league's original franchises, the Houston Comets. The Comets ceased operations on December 1, 2008, after no owners for the franchise could be found. A dispersal draft took place on December 8, 2008, and with the first pick, Sancho Lyttle was taken by the Atlanta Dream.

After an unsatisfying conclusion in 2008, the Mercury looked to bounce back to championship caliber. New head coach Corey Gaines implemented Paul Westhead's style of play, and the Mercury averaged 92.82 points per game throughout the 2009 season. Helped by the return of Penny Taylor, the Mercury once again locked up first place in the Western Conference and advanced to the 2009 Finals. The championship series was a battle of contrasting styles as the Mercury (number one league offense, 92.82 points per game) had to face the Indiana Fever (number three league defense, 73.55 points per game). The series went five games, including arguably one of the most thrilling games in WNBA history in game one of the series (Phoenix won in overtime, 120–116. The Mercury beat the Fever in game five, this time on their home court, to capture their second WNBA championship.

Not only did Paul Westhead's system influence his Mercury team, but it created a domino effect throughout the league. Young athletic players were capable of scoring more and playing at a faster pace. As a league, the 2010 average of 80.35 points per game was the best, far surpassing the 69.2 average in the league's inaugural season.

Changing of the guard (2010–2012)

On October 20, 2009, the WNBA announced that the Detroit Shock would relocate to Tulsa, Oklahoma, to become the Tulsa Shock. On November 20, 2009, the WNBA announced that the Sacramento Monarchs had folded due to lack of support from its current owners, the Maloof family, who were also the owners of the Sacramento Kings at the time. The league announced it would seek new owners to relocate the team to the San Francisco Bay area; however, no ownership was found and a dispersal draft was held on December 14, 2009.

The 2010 season saw a tight race in the East, with three teams being tied for first place on the final day of the regular season. Five of the six teams in the East were in first place at some point during the season. The East held a .681 winning percentage over the West, its highest ever. In the 2010 Finals, two new teams represented each conference: the Seattle Storm and the Atlanta Dream. Seattle made their first finals appearance since winning it all in 2004, and Atlanta, coming into the playoffs as a four seed, impressively swept its opponents in the first two rounds to advance to the Finals in only the third year of the team's existence.

After the 2010 season, President Orender announced she would be resigning from her position as of December 31. On April 21, 2011, NBA commissioner David Stern announced that former Girl Scouts of the USA Senior Vice President and Chief Marketing Officer Laurel J. Richie would assume duties as president on May 16, 2011.

The 2011 season began with strong publicity helped by the rising young stars of the league and the NBA lockout. 
The 2011 NBA lockout began on July 1, 2011. Unlike the previous lockout, which affected the WNBA, president Laurel J. Richie confirmed that this lockout would not affect the WNBA. If the NBA season was shortened or canceled, the 2012 WNBA season (including the WNBA teams still owned by NBA owners) would run as planned. The lockout ended on November 26, and NBA teams would play a 66-game regular season following the lockout.

Many news outlets began covering the league more frequently. NBA TV, the television home of the NBA scheduled over 70 regular-season games to be televised (along with a dozen more on ESPN2 and ABC). The new influx of young talent into the league gave many teams something to be excited about. Players like Candace Parker of the Sparks, Maya Moore of the Lynx, DeWanna Bonner of the Mercury, Angel McCoughtry of the Dream, Sylvia Fowles of the Sky, Tina Charles of the Sun, and Liz Cambage of the Shock brought a new level of excitement to the game, adding talent to the teams of young veterans such as Diana Taurasi, Seimone Augustus and Cappie Pondexter. The level of play seemed to be evidenced by higher scoring, better defense, and higher shooting percentages. By the end of the 2011 regular season, nine of the twelve teams in the league had increased attendance over their 2010 averages.

Connecticut Sun center Tina Charles set a league record for double-doubles in a season with 23. Also, Sylvia Fowles of the Chicago Sky became only the second player in WNBA history to finish a season averaging at least 20 points (20.0ppg) and 10 rebounds (10.2rpg) per game. The San Antonio Silver Stars experienced boosts from their young players as well; rookie Danielle Adams scored 32 points off the bench in June and fellow rookie Danielle Robinson had a 36-point game in September. Atlanta Dream forward Angel McCoughtry was the first player in league history to average over 20 points per game (21.6ppg) while playing under 30 minutes per game (27.9mpg).

McCoughtry led her team to the Finals for the second straight year, but despite breaking her own Finals scoring record, the Dream was swept for the second straight year, this time by the Minnesota Lynx, which won its first title behind a fully healthy Seimone Augustus.

2012 featured a long Olympic break. The Indiana Fever won that year's WNBA championship.

The Three to See (2013)
The much-publicized 2013 WNBA Draft produced Baylor University star Brittney Griner, Delaware's Elena Delle Donne, and Notre Dame All American Skylar Diggins (now Diggins-Smith) as the top three picks, the draft was the first to be televised in primetime on ESPN. Griner, Delle Donne, and Diggins have thus been labeled "The Three To See", but with the draft also came standouts such as Tayler Hill, Layshia Clarendon and Alex Bentley. The retirement of legends Katie Smith, Tina Thompson, Ticha Penicheiro, and Sheryl Swoopes coupled with the arrival of highly touted rookies and new rule changes effectively marked the end of an era for the WNBA and the ushering of another. 

On the court, the Minnesota Lynx won their second title in three years, defeating the Atlanta Dream in the Finals and becoming the first team to sweep the playoff since the Seattle Storm.

The promotion of Griner, Delle Donne, and Diggins helped boost television ratings for the league by 28 percent, and half of the teams ended the season profitable. The improved health of the league was on display after the season, when the Los Angeles Sparks' ownership group folded; it took the league only a few weeks to line up Guggenheim Partners to purchase the team, and the franchise also garnered interest from the ownership of the Golden State Warriors.

Two more franchise relocations happened in the following years, as the Tulsa Shock moved in 2016 to the Dallas–Fort Worth region in Texas, being renamed Dallas Wings, and in 2018 the San Antonio Stars went to Nevada, becoming the Las Vegas Aces.

New CBA and Commissioner's Cup plans (2020) 
During the 2018 season, the WNBA players' union opted out of the collective bargaining agreement (CBA) with the league, which then ended after the 2019 season. In January 2020, the league and union announced that they had reached an agreement on a new CBA to take effect with the 2020 season and running through 2027. Among the features of the new agreement were:
 Total player compensation increased by slightly over 50%. While most of this increase went to star players, all players benefited to some degree, and both sides were interested mainly in limiting, if not eliminating, overseas play by the league's top players.
 Players are able to reach unrestricted free agency a year earlier than before. The previous CBA allowed a team to designate a player as "core"—similar to the NFL's franchise tag—four times. This dropped to three in 2020 and will drop further to two in 2022.
 All player air travel to regular-season games is, at a minimum, premium economy class. Also, each player has her own hotel room for road games.
 Players receive their full salary while on maternity leave. Additionally, an annual childcare stipend of $5,000 per player is provided; teams must make apartments of at least two bedrooms available to players with children, and add facilities for nursing mothers; and the league offers family planning benefits that allow up to a $60,000 reimbursement for veteran players for expenses related to adoption, surrogacy, embryo preservation, or infertility treatment.
 The CBA is transitioning toward severely penalizing veteran players for late arrival at WNBA training camps. By the sixth year of the CBA, players with more than 2 years of service who miss the start of training camp will be suspended for the season. Exceptions include serious injury, national team commitments for non-US players, college graduations, and other significant life events.
 The CBA also addressed the issue of players serving on NBA coaching staffs during the traditional basketball season. This came to a head during the 2019 offseason when the Washington Wizards, owned by the same company that owns the WNBA's Mystics, hired Mystics player Kristi Toliver as an assistant. Under the previous CBA, teams were allowed only $50,000 per year to allocate to players as an enticement to not play overseas. Because of the Mystics' and Wizards' shared ownership, the Wizards could only pay Toliver from the Mystics' $50,000 allocation—most of which had already been committed to Elena Delle Donne, a player who normally does not go overseas. With the new CBA, veteran players can work as coaches in the NBA without a salary limit, regardless of the team's ownership structure.

Also in January 2020, the WNBA announced a new in-season tournament, the Commissioner's Cup, which would begin with the 2020 season. Each team was scheduled to play 10 Cup games during the season: specifically, the first home and road games against each team in its conference. The final Cup games were to be played in July, with the top team in the Cup standings from each conference advancing to a one-off Cup final in August.

The 2020 WNBA schedule originally included a month-long break in July and August to allow players to participate in the 2020 Tokyo Olympics.  The 2020 games were postponed until 2021, due to the COVID-19 pandemic, rendering the break unnecessary.  On April 3, 2020, the WNBA announced that the beginning of its own schedule would be postponed. The 2020 entry draft took place as originally scheduled on April 17, although it was done remotely.  No details of the revised schedule were announced as of the time of the draft, and the Commissioner's Cup was ultimately not held in 2020.

2020 season at IMG Academy 
In June 2020, WNBA Commissioner Cathy Engelbert announced plans for the league to have a 22-game regular season, and a traditional playoff format, to be held exclusively at IMG Academy in Bradenton, Florida. The players were housed at the Bradenton complex, and all games and practices took place there. Players had until June 25 to let their teams know whether they planned to participate.

'Count It' campaign celebrating 25th anniversary (2021) 
On March 15, 2021, an announcement was made that the WNBA would introduce a ceremonial logo, basketball, and uniforms as part of its 25th anniversary celebratory campaign called 'Count It'. Also as part of the campaign, the league unveiled The W25, consisting of 25 players determined to be the league's greatest and most influential, as chosen by a panel made up of media and pioneering women's players.

The delayed launch of the Commissioner's Cup was officially announced on May 12, 2021, two days before the start of the regular season. The originally planned schedule, with the first home game and first road game of each team against each of its fellow conference members doubling as Cup games, was maintained. All Cup games within each conference were played before the league took its Olympic break after July 11. The Cup final, officially termed the Commissioner's Cup Championship Game, involves the conference leaders in the Cup standings; its first edition was held on August 12 as the league's first game after the Olympic break, and was streamed via Amazon Prime Video. A prize pool of $500,000 is provided for the Cup, with players on the winning team guaranteed a minimum bonus of $30,000 and those of the losing team guaranteed $10,000, and the championship game MVP receiving an extra $5,000.

Teams

The WNBA originated with 8 teams in 1997, and through a sequence of expansions, contractions, and relocations currently consists of 12 teams. There have been a total of 18 franchises in WNBA history.

As of the league's most recent 2022 season, the Las Vegas Aces (formerly the Utah Starzz and San Antonio (Silver) Stars), Los Angeles Sparks, New York Liberty, and Phoenix Mercury are the only remaining franchises that were founded in 1997.

Arenas listed below reflect those expected to be used in the league's next season in 2023.

Notes

Relationship with NBA teams

Six WNBA teams are associated with an NBA team from the same market and are known as sister teams. These teams include the Brooklyn Nets and New York Liberty, the Indiana Pacers and Fever, the Los Angeles Lakers and Sparks, the Minnesota Timberwolves and Lynx, the Phoenix Suns and Mercury, and the Washington Wizards and Mystics. Of these teams, only the Sparks have completely separate ownership. The Liberty had been associated with the New York Knicks, having been owned by the Knicks' parent company, The Madison Square Garden Company, but the team was sold in January 2019 to a group led by Joseph Tsai, then a minority owner of the Nets and now sole owner of that team. Through the 2017 season, the San Antonio Spurs and Stars were also paired, but that relationship ended in October 2017 when the Stars were bought by MGM Resorts International and moved to Las Vegas.

Three WNBA teams are in the same market as an NBA team but are not affiliated. Though located in the same market, the Chicago Sky is not affiliated with the Bulls, as evidenced by their differing home arenas: the Sky play at Wintrust Arena in Chicago's Near South Side, while the Bulls play at United Center in the city's Near West Side. The Dallas Wings, which had been the Tulsa Shock before moving to the Dallas–Fort Worth Metroplex after the 2015 season, are not affiliated with the existing NBA team in the Metroplex, the Dallas Mavericks. As with the Sky and Bulls, the Wings and Mavericks play in different areas, with the Wings playing at College Park Center in Arlington as opposed to the Mavericks playing in downtown Dallas at American Airlines Center. While the Atlanta Dream shared State Farm Arena with the Hawks from the Dream's inception in 2008 to 2016 and again in 2019, the Hawks never held any ownership stake in the WNBA team.

The remaining WNBA team, the Seattle Storm, was formerly the sister team of the SuperSonics, but was sold to a Seattle-based group before the SuperSonics relocated and became the Oklahoma City Thunder.

The now-defunct Charlotte Sting, Miami Sol, Portland Fire, Cleveland Rockers, Orlando Miracle, Houston Comets and Sacramento Monarchs were also sister teams of the Hornets, Heat, Trail Blazers, Cavaliers, Magic, Rockets and Kings, respectively. The Utah Starzz were affiliated with the Jazz before relocating to San Antonio as the Silver Stars under the ownership of the parent company of the Spurs in 2003. Becoming the Stars in 2014, they shared the Spurs' team colors. The team would eventually relocate to Las Vegas as the Aces in 2017. The Detroit Shock was the sister team of the Pistons until the teams' owner sold the Shock to investors who moved the team to Tulsa, Oklahoma. During its tenure in Tulsa, it was not affiliated with Oklahoma's NBA team, the Oklahoma City Thunder.

Five teams share a market with an NBA G League team. Two of these also share arenas: the Dream share College Park and the Gateway Center Arena with the College Park Skyhawks, while the Mystics share Washington, D.C. and the Entertainment and Sports Arena with the Capital City Go-Go. Also, the Sparks share the Los Angeles market with the Ontario Clippers and South Bay Lakers, the Wings share the Dallas–Fort Worth market with the Texas Legends, and the Liberty shares the New York City market with the Long Island Nets and Westchester Knicks. Two other teams are located within 150 miles of WNBA teams (the Delaware Blue Coats and Fort Wayne Mad Ants being near the Mystics and Fever, respectively). The Stars were also within 150 miles of a G League team (the Austin Spurs) before their move to Las Vegas. The Shock shared the Tulsa market with the Tulsa 66ers until the latter team was relocated to become the Oklahoma City Blue in 2014, while the Mercury were about 100 miles from the Northern Arizona Suns before the Suns moved to Detroit.

Membership timeline

Relocated teams
 Detroit Shock – 1998–2009 (relocated to Tulsa, Oklahoma)
 Orlando Miracle – 1999–2002 (relocated to Uncasville, Connecticut)
 Utah Starzz – 1997–2002 (relocated to San Antonio, Texas)
 Tulsa Shock – 2010–2015 (relocated to Arlington, Texas)
 San Antonio Stars – 2003–2017 (relocated to Las Vegas, Nevada)

Folded teams
 Charlotte Sting – 1997–2006
 Cleveland Rockers – 1997–2003 
 Houston Comets – 1997–2008 
 Miami Sol – 2000–2002 
 Portland Fire – 2000–2002 
 Sacramento Monarchs – 1997–2009

Season format

Regular season

Teams hold training camps in May. Training camps allow the coaching staff to prepare the players for the regular season and determine the 12-woman roster with which they will begin the regular season. After training camp, a series of preseason exhibition games are held.

The WNBA regular season begins in May. Come 2023 during the regular season, each team will play 40 games, 20 each of home & away. As in the NBA, each team hosts and visits every other team at least once every season.

During years in which the Summer Olympics are held, the WNBA takes a month off in the middle of the season to allow players to practice and compete with their respective national teams. During years in which the FIBA World Cup is held, the WNBA either takes a break for the World Cup or ends its season early, depending on the scheduling of the World Cup.

WNBA Commissioner's Cup

The 2020 season was planned to be the first for the Commissioner's Cup, an in-season tournament. Each team's first home and away games against each of its conference opponents, all of which were to be played in the first half of the season, were designated as Cup games. After each team played its 10 Cup games, the top team in each conference's Cup standings would advance to the Commissioner's Cup Final, a single match held in August. The COVID-19 pandemic caused the tournament to be scrapped for the time being; the tournament instead launched in 2021 under the originally announced format.

WNBA All-Star Game

In 1999, the league held its first-ever All-Star Game, where the best players of the Eastern Conference played against the best players of the Western Conference. The West dominated play until 2006, when the East finally won a game.

In July, the regular season pauses to celebrate the annual WNBA All-Star Game. The game is part of a weekend-long event, held in a selected WNBA city each year. The game is played on the selected WNBA team's home court. Through the 2017 edition, the All-Star Game featured star players from the Western Conference facing star players from the Eastern Conference. Since 2018, conference affiliations have been ignored in team selections. During the season, voting for All-Star starters takes place among fans, WNBA players, and sports media members. The starters are selected by a weighted vote (fans 50%, players and media 25% each), while reserves are selected by the league's head coaches. The two players with the most fan votes are named team captains, who then fill out their teams in a draft format similar to that currently used for the NBA All-Star Game.

In 2004, The Game at Radio City was held in a place of a traditional All-Star Game. The 2006 All-Star Game was the first game to feature custom uniforms that match the decade anniversary logo. From 2008 through 2016, no All-Star Game was held in any Summer Olympic year. In 2010, an exhibition game (Stars at the Sun) was held. Although the 2020 Summer Olympics were postponed to 2021 due to COVID-19, no All-Star Game was played in that season. The 2021 season featured the first All-Star Game in an Olympic year since 2000; this contest featured a WNBA all-star team facing the US national team.

Shortly after the All-Star break is the trading deadline. After this date, teams are not allowed to exchange players with each other for the remainder of the season, although they may still sign and release players. Major trades are often completed right before the trading deadline.

WNBA Playoffs

The WNBA Playoffs usually begin in late September, though in years of the FIBA World Cup they begin in August. In the current system, the eight best teams by the regular-season record, without regard to conference alignment, qualify for the playoffs. Since 2022, the playoffs have been held in a standard knockout format, with the first round consisting of best-of-three series and the semifinals and finals being best-of-five. Since 2021, Google has been the official sponsor.

Having a higher seed offers several advantages. The higher seed will generally face a weaker team, and will have home-court advantage in each round. In the current playoff format, all quarterfinal series use a 2–1 home-court pattern, which allows the higher seed the opportunity to win the series without having to visit the lower seed. This in turn means that a lower seed that wins one of the first two games will host the series decider.

The quarterfinals are bracketed in the normal manner for an 8-team tournament, with 1 vs. 8 and 4 vs. 5 on one side of the bracket and 2 vs. 7 and 3 vs. 6 on the other. The winners of each quarterfinal series advance to the semifinals, with the bracket not being reseeded. The semifinals use a 2–2–1 home-court pattern, meaning that the higher-seeded team will have home court in games 1, 2, and 5 while the other team plays at home in game 3 and 4. The finals are also played in a 2–2–1 home-court pattern.

WNBA Finals

The final playoff round, a best-of-five series between the two semifinal winners, is known as the WNBA Finals and is held annually, currently scheduled for October. Each player on the winning team receives a championship ring. Also, the league awards a WNBA Finals Most Valuable Player Award. For this round, the series follows a 2–2–1 pattern, meaning that one team will have home court in games 1, 2, and 5, while the other plays at home in games 3 and 4. The 2–2–1 pattern in the WNBA Finals has been in place since 2005.

League championships
The Houston Comets, Minnesota Lynx, and Seattle Storm hold the distinction of having won the most championships with four titles each. The Comets folded in 2008. The Lynx have the most appearances in the championship with six, all occurring in the seven years from 2011 to 2017.
Teams in red have folded.

Former teams that have no WNBA Finals appearances: 
Cleveland Rockers (1997–2003)
Miami Sol (2000–2002) 
Portland Fire (2000–2002)

Players and coaches

In 2011, a decade and a half after the launch of the WNBA, only two players remained from the league's inaugural season in 1997: Sheryl Swoopes and Tina Thompson. Lisa Leslie was the longest-tenured player from the 1997 draft class; she spent her entire career (1997–2009) with the Los Angeles Sparks. Sue Bird holds both of the league's most significant longevity records—number of seasons in the league (19) and games played (580).

The members of the WNBA's All-Decade Team were chosen in 2006 on the occasion of the tenth anniversary of the WNBA from amongst 30 nominees compiled by fans, media, coach, and player voting. The team was to comprise the 10 best and most influential players of the first decade of the WNBA, with consideration also given to sportsmanship, community service, leadership, and contribution to the growth of women's basketball.

Players for the WNBA's Top 15 Team were chosen in 2011 on the anniversary of the league's fifteenth season from amongst 30 nominees compiled similarly to that of the All-Decade Team process. This process was repeated for the league's 20th anniversary season in 2016 with the selection of the WNBA Top 20@20, and for the 25th anniversary season in 2021 with the selection of The W25.

Over 30 players have scored at least 3,000 points in their WNBA careers. Only 14 WNBA players have reached the 6,000 point milestone: Diana Taurasi, Tina Thompson, Tamika Catchings, Tina Charles, Candice Dupree, Cappie Pondexter, Sue Bird, Katie Smith, Sylvia Fowles, Candace Parker, Lisa Leslie, DeWanna Bonner, Seimone Augustus, and Lauren Jackson. The scoring average leader is Cynthia Cooper, who averaged 21.0 points per game in five seasons with the Houston Comets (1997–2000, 2003).

In 2007, Paul Westhead of the Phoenix Mercury became the first person to earn both NBA and WNBA championship rings as a coach.

In 2008, 50-year-old Nancy Lieberman became the oldest player to play in a WNBA game. She signed a seven-day contract with the Detroit Shock and played one game, tallying two assists and two turnovers in nine minutes of action. By playing in the one game Lieberman broke a record that she had set in 1997 when she was the league's oldest player at 39. The oldest player to have participated in a full season is Bird, who completed her final season in 2022 less than two months before turning 42.

Sue Bird, who played for the Seattle Storm from 2002 until her retirement in 2022 (though she missed the 2013 and 2019 seasons to injury), holds the record for career assists with 3,234 in 580 regular-season games. The record for most assists per game is currently held by Courtney Vandersloot, an American who also holds a Hungarian passport and represents that country internationally. She has averaged 6.64 assists per game during her career with the Chicago Sky (2011–present). Vandersloot also has the top five seasons in assists per game, with 8.1 in 2017, 8.6 in 2018 and 2021, 9.1 in 2019, and 10.0 in 2020.

Milestones

Awards
Around the beginning of September (or late August in Olympic and FIBA World Cup years), the regular season ends. It is during this time that voting begins for individual awards. The Sixth Player of the Year Award (known before 2021 as the "Sixth Woman" award) is given to the best player coming off the bench (must have more games coming off the bench than actual games started). The Rookie of the Year Award is awarded to the most outstanding first-year player. The Most Improved Player Award is awarded to the player who is deemed to have shown the most improvement from the previous season. The Defensive Player of the Year Award is awarded to the league's best defender. The Kim Perrot Sportsmanship Award is awarded to the player who shows outstanding sportsmanship on and off the court. The Coach of the Year Award is awarded to the coach that has made the most positive difference to a team. The Most Valuable Player Award is given to the player deemed the most valuable for her team that season. The Basketball Executive of the Year Award is presented to the team executive most instrumental in his or her team's success in that season. The newest WNBA award, first presented in 2019, is the season-long version of the WNBA Community Assist Award, presented to a player for especially meritorious community service.

Also named are the All-WNBA Teams, the All-Defensive Teams, and the All-Rookie Team; each consists of five players. There are two All-WNBA teams; starting with the 2022 season, each consists of five top players selected without regard to position, with first-team status being the most desirable. There are two All-Defensive teams, each consisting of the top defenders at each position. Finally, there is one All-Rookie team, consisting of the top five first-year players regardless of position. (In all cases, a tie in voting may lead to a team containing six players instead of five.)

Most recent award winners
All listed winners are from the 2022 season.

Notes

Retired numbers

Pending number retirements

Notes

Notable international players

A number of international players that have played in the WNBA have earned multiple all-stars or won MVP awards:
  Elena Baranova, Russia – among the first international players in the WNBA (1997), one-time All-Star (2001).
  Zheng Haixia, China – first winner of the Kim Perrot Sportsmanship Award and first international player to win a WNBA award (1997)
  Margo Dydek, Poland – first international player to be #1 draft pick (1998)
  Lauren Jackson, Australia – two-time champion (2004, 2010), three-time MVP and eight-time All-Star
  Ticha Penicheiro, Portugal – won a championship with the Monarchs in 2005 and four-time All-Star
  Penny Taylor, Australia – three-time champion (2007, 2009, 2014) and four-time All-Star
  Tammy Sutton-Brown, Canada – two-time All-Star
  Sophia Young, Saint Vincent and the Grenadines – four-time All-Star
 Janeth Arcain, Brazil  – four-time champion (1997–2000), one-time All-Star (2001) and Most Improved Player Award (2001)

Some of these players, among them Penicheiro, Sutton-Brown, and Young played U.S. college basketball.

Rules and regulations
Rules are governed by standard basketball rules as defined by the NBA, with a few notable exceptions:
The main arc is essentially identical to that used by FIBA (effective October 1, 2012 for domestic competitions) and NCAA play (effective in 2019–20 in Division I and 2020–21 in Divisions II and III for men, and in 2021–22 for all women's play). The WNBA corner distance, as measured from the center of the basket, is identical to that of the NBA; the FIBA and NCAA distance at the corners is  shorter.
 The regulation WNBA ball is a minimum  in circumference and weighs ,  smaller and  lighter than the NBA ball.  Since 2004, this size has been used for all senior-level women's competitions throughout the world in full-court basketball. Competitions in the half-court 3x3 variant used the women's ball until 2015, when a dedicated ball with the circumference of the women's ball but the weight of the men's ball was introduced. Wilson became the WNBA ball supplier in 2021. Prior to that year, Spalding had been the ball supplier since 1997.
 Quarters are 10 minutes in duration instead of 12.

Games are divided into four 10-minute quarters as opposed to the league's original two 20-minute halves of play, similar to FIBA and NCAA women's college rules.

A recent trend with new WNBA rules has been to match them with a similar NBA rule. Since the 2006 WNBA season:
 The winner of the opening jump ball shall begin the 4th quarter with the ball out of bounds. The loser shall begin with the ball out of bounds in the second and third quarters. Previously under the two-half format, both periods started with jump balls, presumably to eliminate the possibility of a team purposely losing the opening tip to gain the opening possession of the second half. This is not a problem under the four-quarters because the winner of the opening tip gets the opening possession of the final period.
 The shot clock was decreased from 30 to 24 seconds, matching the FIBA shot clock. Starting in 2020, the last 5 seconds of the shot clock counted down in tenths of a second.

The 2007 WNBA season brought changes that included:
 The amount of time that a team must move the ball across the half-court line went from 10 to 8 seconds.
 A referee can grant time-outs to either a player or the coach.
 Two free throws and possession of the ball for a clear-path-to-the-basket foul. Previously only one free throw was awarded as well as possession.

In 2012, the WNBA added the block/charge arc under the basket. As of 2013 the defensive three-second rule and anti-flopping guidelines were introduced. The three-point line was also extended; in 2017, that line extended into the corners to match the NBA's.

Since 2017, Tissot is the official timekeeper for the league, as it uses a unified game clock/shot clock system.

Court dimensions

Business

Finance
During the mid-2000s, the NBA spent more than $10 million per year to keep the WNBA financially solvent. In 2007, teams were estimated to be losing $1.5 million to $2 million a year.

Due to the lack of viewership, the WNBA has not been profitable in past years. The league projected losses through the 2010 season to be around $400 million.

The league has begun to do better financially in recent years. In December 2010, Donna Orender said that the league had its first-ever "cash flow positive" team during the 2010 season. In 2011, three teams were profitable, and in 2013, six of the league's 12 teams reported a profit. The league has also signed extended television contracts with ESPN and sponsorship agreements with Boost Mobile.

Activism

The New York Times in 2020 called the WNBA "the most socially progressive pro league."

As the popularity of the league has grown, players have gained more voice and power to perform as activists in many fields. One of the activist players' main focuses is the inequality between men's and women's sports. Many players such as Brittney Griner, Breanna Stewart, and Maya Moore have spoken about equality between gender, sexual orientation, and race. The players have also supported progressive social and political movements such as Black Lives Matter and others. Shortly after the George Floyd protests began, the league and union decided in 2020 to put Black Lives Matter and Say Her Name slogans on warmup gear and opening weekend uniforms. When team owner Senator Kelly Loeffler criticized the league's support for Black Lives Matter, her team wore black T-shirts with the slogan "VOTE WARNOCK", endorsing her election opponent Raphael Warnock, an African-American pastor who defeated Loeffler.

In 2021, during the COVID-19 pandemic, the WNBA led American professional sports teams in promoting the COVID-19 vaccine. Teams hosted vaccine clinics in their home arenas. In April the league and union's Social Justice Council made a PSA, Our Health is Worth a Shot, that aired during the WNBA draft. In June 2021, the WNBA announced that 99% of its players had been fully vaccinated.

Sponsorships
On June 1, 2009, the Phoenix Mercury was the first team in WNBA history to announce a marquee sponsorship. The team secured a partnership with LifeLock to brand their jerseys and warm-ups. It was the first branded jersey in WNBA history. Following the expiration of the LifeLock deal, the Mercury secured a new uniform sponsorship deal with Casino Arizona and Talking Stick Resort on February 3, 2014.

Other teams eventually followed in the Mercury's footsteps; some teams feature sponsors prominently on the front of their jerseys, while others have sponsors on the upper left-hand shoulder.

On August 22, 2011, the WNBA announced a league-wide marquee sponsorship with Boost Mobile. The deal would allow the Boost Mobile logo to be placed on eleven of the 12 teams' jerseys (excluding San Antonio) in addition to branding on the courts and in arenas. A source said the deal is a "multiyear, eight-figure deal".

In 2009, the Phoenix Mercury became the first American professional basketball team to feature advertisements on their uniform, when they sold an ad to LifeLock Insurance on the front of their jerseys, leading many people to wonder if ads on NBA uniforms were coming soon. Since then several other WNBA teams have followed suit. The NBA announced in the summer of 2016 that they will begin to feature advertisements on jerseys, with the first team to do so being the Philadelphia 76ers (with a StubHub sticker now on their jerseys).

Before the start of the 2011 season, every team announced a new look for their uniforms. The supplier of the uniforms for the league, Adidas, upgraded all teams to new high-tech designs, much like they did for the NBA before the start of their season.

On April 8, 2019, the WNBA announced a multiyear marquee partnership with AT&T, making them the first non-apparel partner to have its logo featured on the front of all 12 team jerseys. The jerseys officially debuted during the 2019 WNBA draft.

Salaries, rosters, and collective bargaining
Before the 2009 season, the maximum team roster size was changed from 13 players (11 active and 2 inactive) to 11 players (all active). Any team that falls below nine players able to play due to injury or any other factor outside of the control of the team will, upon request, be granted a roster hardship exception allowing the team to sign an additional player or players so that the team will have nine players able to play in an upcoming game or games. As soon as the injured (or otherwise sidelined) player(s) can play, the roster hardship player(s)—not any other player on the roster—must be waived.
In March 2014, the WNBA and players signed a new, eight-year collective bargaining agreement, increasing the number of players on a roster to 12.

The WNBA Draft is held annually every spring. The minimum age is 22 years for American players and 20 years for international players, measured as of December 31 of the calendar year of the draft. For draft purposes, "American" includes those born in the U.S., as well as those who have enrolled in a U.S. college or university, regardless of their citizenship. The draft is three rounds long, with each of the 12 teams in the league (trades aside) getting three picks each. The draft order for the eight teams that made the playoffs the previous year are based on team records, and the team with the highest previous record will pick last. For the remaining top four picks, a selection process similar to the NBA Draft Lottery is conducted for the four teams that did not qualify for the playoffs.

Previously, in 2008, a new six-year collective bargaining agreement was agreed upon between the players and the league. The salary cap for an entire team in 2010 was $827,000 (although it was later lowered to $775,000). By 2013 (the sixth year under this agreement), the cap for an entire team was $900,000. In 2010, the minimum salary for a player with three-plus years of experience was $51,000 while the maximum salary for a six-plus year player was $101,500 (the first time in league history that players can receive over $100,000). The minimum salary for rookies was $35,190. Many WNBA players supplement their salaries by playing in European, Australian, or more recently Chinese women's basketball leagues during the WNBA offseason. The WNBA has been criticized for paying female players less than their NBA counterparts, although this is attributed to the much greater revenues of the NBA.

The decision of superstar Diana Taurasi to sit out the 2015 WNBA season was seen by some in the media as a harbinger of salary-related troubles in the future. The Russian club for which she was playing at the time, UMMC Ekaterinburg, offered her a bonus well over the league's maximum player salary to sit out that season. Taurasi accepted, largely because she had not had an offseason since playing college basketball more than a decade earlier. Such offers have often been made to star American players, including Taurasi herself, but none were accepted until Taurasi did so in 2015.

A more recent incident that led to widespread media comment on the WNBA's salary structure was the torn Achilles suffered by reigning WNBA MVP Breanna Stewart while playing for another Russian side, Dynamo Kursk, in the 2019 EuroLeague Women final. The injury came at a time when the WNBA and its players' union were preparing to negotiate a new collective bargaining agreement, following the union's announcement in November 2018 that it would opt out of the current CBA after the 2019 season. With overseas leagues offering much higher salaries to many players than the WNBA currently provides, roughly 70% of the league's players go overseas in any given season. While these players do not necessarily play as many games as NBA players do in their seasons, even participants in the NBA Finals get several months of rest in the offseason, something not available for WNBA players who also play overseas. In a story on the ramifications of Stewart's injury, M.A. Voepel of ESPN had this to say about the lead-in to the injury:

The current CBA, which took effect in 2020, significantly increased minimum and maximum salaries. The minimum league salary in 2020 was $57,000 for players with less than three years of experience, and $68,000 otherwise. For most players, the 2020 maximum salary was $185,000; players who met specified criteria for league service had a maximum of $215,000.

WNBA players are awarded bonuses for certain achievements. Some of the bonuses given by the league (amount is per player), from 2020 to 2027 (the duration of the current CBA):
WNBA champion: $11,356; Runner-up: $5,678; Most Valuable Player: $15,450; All-WNBA First Team member: $10,300; and All-Star Game participant: $2,575. These were only modest increases from amounts provided before 2020.

In recent years, the lack of roster space for rookies, thus hampering their professional development, has become a major issue. While the 2020 CBA led to maximum player salaries nearly doubling from 2019 to 2022, the team cap only increased by slightly less than 40% in that period. Because the cap is a hard cap, many WNBA teams now carry only 11 players on their rosters instead of the maximum 12, leading Stewart to state "We’re at a tipping point. . . . without some easy tweaks, we are no longer a league that has 12 teams and 144 players — it’s more like 133." The WNBA also has no developmental league similar to the NBA G League; Chiney Ogwumike, a vice president of the players' union, publicly called for such a league. While roster limits have always been a significant issue in the league—between the first WNBA draft in 1997 and 2021, more than 40% of drafted players never made a roster—this became especially apparent at the dawn of the 2020s. In one notable example, the 2019 Naismith Trophy winner Megan Gustafson did not make an opening-day roster in 2019, and had only played in parts of the 2019–2021 seasons before being cut in the 2022 preseason. This issue gained major publicity during the week before the start of the 2022 season. The Minnesota Lynx, which began that week with barely over $12,000 of cap room, cut six players, including the 2020 Rookie of the Year Crystal Dangerfield, their 2021 first-round pick Rennia Davis, and both of their 2022 draft picks. The Seattle Storm, whose first 2022 draft pick was in the middle of the second round, waived that pick (Elissa Cunane), and the Las Vegas Aces waived both of their picks, one of them a first-rounder.

Another clause in the 2020 CBA, known as the "prioritization" clause, has been viewed as a potential problem for the league. Because of overseas league commitments, a significant number of WNBA players have reported late to training camp each season. Several overseas leagues and continental club competitions overlap with WNBA training camps, and even with the start of the WNBA season. For example, 55 WNBA players missed the start of training camp in 2021, meaning that most teams were unable to start practice with their full rosters. Starting in 2023, teams will be required to fine players with more than two years of WNBA experience who miss the start of training camp. (Exemptions are provided for national team commitments, graduations, and other significant life events.) Starting in 2024, the league can penalize a veteran player who does not report to camp with a season-long suspension without pay. In a 2021 episode of a podcast hosted by Napheesa Collier and A'ja Wilson, Collier raised the prospect of players choosing to abandon the WNBA for higher overseas salaries, telling Wilson "If I’m not making that much in the league, if it’s not enough for me to survive on during the year, I’m going overseas and having the summer off."  When Stewart re-signed with the Seattle Storm as a free agent before the 2022 season, she cited the prioritization clause as the reason she only signed a one-year contract.

Merchandise
The following shows the top jersey sales during the 2021 regular season, based on sales through the WNBA's official online store.

However, a story by NBC Sports journalist Alex Azzi argued that the WNBA's merchandise rankings were misleading for multiple reasons.
 At any given time, the WNBA has at most 144 players, but at the time of the story, "ready to ship" replica team jerseys were available for fewer than 20 of them. Many of the league's top players in the 2021 season were not among those with "ready to ship" jerseys. The only such jersey available for Jonquel Jones, who would be named league MVP shortly after the story ran, was a replica of the jersey she wore in that season's All-Star Game, and not her Connecticut Sun jersey. The league's leading scorer that season, Tina Charles, had no ready-made jersey available for sale. Also, not all of the ready-made jerseys were available in youth sizes. All other player replica jerseys must be custom-ordered, which take longer to ship, cost more, and are only available in adult sizes. The only Minnesota Lynx player with a ready-made jersey, Maya Moore, has not played in the league since 2018.
 Some teams, among them the Lynx, offer a larger variety of ready-made replica jerseys in their online team stores. Also, Dick's Sporting Goods, which had entered into a multi-year marketing agreement with the league shortly before the story ran, has a wider availability of such jerseys than the WNBA online store. However, the league's official merchandise rankings do not include sales through any outlets other than its online store.
 While over 80% of WNBA players are black, the top three on this list, as well as four of the top five, are white. A study by two researchers at the University of Massachusetts published earlier in 2021 concluded that after controlling for points and rebounds, white players individually averaged twice as much media mentions as black players during the 2020 season. This discrepancy was specifically called out by white UConn superstar Paige Bueckers during her acceptance speech at the 2021 ESPY Awards, and Azzi argued that it contributed to the perceived racial bias in the WNBA merchandise rankings.

The following shows the top teams in merchandise sales during the 2021 regular season.

WNBA Presidents / Commissioners
The title of the league's chief executive was "President" before Cathy Engelbert became the first "Commissioner".
 Val Ackerman, 1996–2005
 Donna Orender, 2005–2010
 Chris Granger, 2011 (interim)
 Laurel J. Richie, 2011–2015
 Lisa Borders, 2015–2018
 Mark Tatum, 2018–2019 (interim)
 Cathy Engelbert, 2019–present

Attendance
In 2012, the average attendance per game dropped from 7,955 to 7,457 (−6.3%). Attendance per game stayed consistent at around 7,520 per game. In 2015, the WNBA's attendance per game decreased by 3.4 percent to 7,318. This was a record low for the WNBA since it was created in 1997. Many teams have experienced drops in their attendance; (San Antonio Stars: −37.4%, Washington Mystics: −7.9%, Tulsa Shock: −7.2%) these losses have caused the attendance of the WNBA to drop.

President Laurel Richie stated that after the 2015 season ends, they will create an expansion committee and begin evaluating if and how the WNBA should go about expanding their reach.

The 2018 and 2019 seasons each set the lowest average attendance in WNBA history (6,769 and 6,535). However, about half of the decline in attendance from 2017 to 2018 was due to the New York Liberty moving from 19,812-seat Madison Square Garden to the 5,000-seat Westchester County Center. While the Liberty had averaged over 9,000 fans in 2017, James Dolan, then the team's owner, noted that roughly half of the team's attendance in that season came from complimentary tickets. Similarly in 2019, the Washington Mystics moved from the 20,356-seat Capital One Arena to the 4,111-seat Entertainment and Sports Arena. The Las Vegas Aces and New York Liberty each saw double-digit percentage losses in 2019, but half of the league's teams saw attendance increases in that season, and the number of sellouts was the same in both seasons (41).

Media coverage

Currently, WNBA games are televised throughout the U.S. by ABC, ESPN, ESPN2, Twitter, NBATV, CBS, and CBS Sports Network.

In the early years, two women's-oriented networks, Lifetime and Oxygen, also broadcast games, including the first game of the WNBA. NBC showed games from 1997 to 2002 as part of their NBA on NBC coverage before the league transferred the rights to ABC/ESPN.

In 2007, the WNBA and ESPN came to an 8-year television agreement. The agreement would be the first to pay television rights fees to the league's teams. Never before had an agreement promised rights fees to a women's professional league. The agreement ran from 2009 to 2016 and was worth millions of dollars.

In June 2007, the WNBA signed a contract extension with ESPN. The new television deal runs from 2009 to 2016. A minimum of 18 games will be broadcast on ABC, ESPN, and ESPN2 each season; the rights to broadcast the first regular-season game and the All-Star game are held by ABC. Additionally, a minimum of 11 postseason games will be broadcast on any of the three stations. Along with this deal, came the first-ever rights fees to be paid to a women's professional sports league. Over the eight years of the contract, "millions and millions of dollars" will be "dispersed to the league's teams".

In 2013, the WNBA and ESPN signed a six-year extension on the broadcast deal to cover 2017–2022. In the new deal, a total of 30 games would be shown each season on ESPN networks. Each team would receive around $1 million per year.

On April 22, 2019, CBS Sports Network reached a multi-year deal to televise 40 regular-season weekend and primetime WNBA games, beginning in the 2019 season.

Some teams offer games on local radio, while all teams have some games broadcast on local television stations:

Atlanta – Bally Sports SouthBally Sports Southeast
Chicago – WCIU-TV, WMEU-CD, Marquee Sports Network
Connecticut – NESN, WCCT-TV
Dallas – Bally Sports Southwest
Indiana – Bally Sports Indiana, WNDY
Las Vegas – KVVU
Los Angeles – Spectrum SportsNet
Minnesota – Bally Sports North
New York – YES
Phoenix – Bally Sports Arizona
Seattle – KZJO
Washington – Monumental Sports Network, NBC Sports Washington

From 2010 to 2011, the regular-season broadcast drew 270,000 viewers a growth of 5 percent from 2010's numbers. As sponsorships continued to grow with deals from ESPN to air WNBA games on ESPN and ESPN 2. The league did experience some success on the digital forefront. It saw increases on its mobile page views by 26 percent along with a major increase in its social media space; Instagram grew by 51 percent this past year.

WNBA League Pass

In 2009, the WNBA announced the launch of WNBA LiveAccess, a feature on WNBA.com that provides fans with access to more than 200 live game webcasts throughout the WNBA season. All of the WNBA LiveAccess games are then archived for on-demand viewing. Most games (except broadcasts on ABC, ESPN or ESPN2, which are available on ESPN3) are available via this system. The first use of LiveAccess was the E League versus Chicago Sky preseason game.

Before the 2011 season, LiveAccess was given an overhaul, and the system became more reliable and many new features were added. Before the 2012 season, it was announced that users of LiveAccess would have to pay a $4.99 subscription fee to use the service. In 2013, this was increased to $14.99. In 2014 the streaming service was renamed WNBA League Pass.

WNBA League Pass is available as part of the WNBA App, the free mobile application available on the iPhone, iPad and Android devices and costs US$16.99 for the season. Games airing on ESPN, ESPN2 and CBS Sports Network, as well as other games taking place during the telecast windows of ESPN and ESPN2 games, are not available live on WNBA League Pass. However, those games will be available on-demand shortly after the conclusion of their live broadcast.

Viewership

On the 2008 season opening day (May 17), ABC broadcast the Los Angeles Sparks and Phoenix Mercury matchup to showcase new rookie sensation Candace Parker. The game received a little over 1 million viewers.

Ratings still remain poor in comparison to NBA games. In 2008, WNBA games averaged just 413,000 viewers, compared to 1.46 million viewers on ESPN and over 2.2 million on ABC for NBA games. In addition, WNBA games have much poorer visibility, attendance, and ratings than NCAA games. However, ESPN viewership grew 35% in 2018 over 2017. This became the impetus for the multi-year partnership in which CBS Sports Network would broadcast live WNBA games beginning with the 2019 season.

All-time franchise history

See also

 
 Best WNBA Player ESPY Award
 List of Australian WNBA players
 List of current WNBA broadcasters
 List of foreign WNBA players
 List of WNBA Finals broadcasters
 List of WNBA career scoring leaders
 List of WNBA first overall draft choices
 List of WNBA head coaches
 List of WNBA players
 List of WNBA seasons
 Prominent women's sports leagues in the United States and Canada
 Professional sports leagues in the United States
 Timeline of women's basketball

References

Citations

General references

External links

 
 WNBA statistics at Basketball-Reference.com

 
1996 establishments in the United States
Professional sports leagues in the United States
 
Sports leagues established in 1996